The Grenada Athletic Association (GAA) is the governing body for the sport of athletics in Grenada.

History 
GAA was founded as Grenada Amateur Athletic Association in 1924, and was affiliated to the IAAF in 1970.

Current president is Charles George.  He was re-elected in 2014 for another four-year term.

Affiliations 
GAA is the national member federation for Grenada in the following international organisations:
International Association of Athletics Federations (IAAF)
North American, Central American and Caribbean Athletic Association (NACAC)
Association of Panamerican Athletics (APA)
Central American and Caribbean Athletic Confederation (CACAC)
Moreover, it is part of the following national organisations:
Grenada Olympic Committee (GOC)

National records 
GAA maintains the Grenadian records in athletics.

References

External links
GAA official website 
Facebook

Grenada
Athletics in Grenada
Athletics
1924 establishments in Grenada
Sports organizations established in 1924
National governing bodies for athletics